L. africana may refer to:
 Loxodonta africana, the African bush elephant, a mammal species
 Lovenula africana, a crustacean species
 Lonchoptera africana, a spear-winged fly species in the genus Lonchoptera

See also
 Africana (disambiguation)